The 2005 ICC Awards were held at the Four Seasons Hotel in Sydney, Australia on 11 October 2005. The judging period covered was from 1 August 2004 to 31 July 2005. This did not include the whole of the 2005 Ashes series, since the final four matches of this series were played in August and September. In association with the Federation of International Cricketers' Associations (FICA), the awards were presented by Hyundai at a function during the Super Series between champions Australia and the ICC World XI.

Selection Committee
Nominees were voted on by a 50-member academy of current and ex-players and officials from among players chosen by the ICC Selection Committee, chaired by ICC Cricket Hall of Famer Sunil Gavaskar.

Selection Committee members:

 Sunil Gavaskar (chairman)
 David Gower
 Richard Hadlee
 Rod Marsh
 Courtney Walsh

Winners and nominees
The winners and nominees of various individual awards were:

Cricketer of the Year

Winners: Andrew Flintoff (Eng) and Jacques Kallis (SA)
Nominees: Rahul Dravid (Ind), Inzamam-ul-Haq (Pak), Adam Gilchrist (Aus), Glenn McGrath (Aus), Ricky Ponting (Aus)

Test Player of the Year

Winner: Jacques Kallis (SA)
Nominees: Shivnarine Chanderpaul (WI), Adam Gilchrist (Aus), Inzamam-ul-Haq (Pak), Younis Khan (Pak), Brian Lara (WI), Damien Martyn (Aus), Anil Kumble (Ind), Glenn McGrath (Aus), Ricky Ponting (Aus), Danish Kaneria (Pak), Kumar Sangakkara (SL), Virender Sehwag (Ind), Harbhajan Singh (Ind), Shane Warne (Aus)

ODI Player of the Year

Winner: Kevin Pietersen (Eng)
Nominees: Rahul Dravid (Ind), Andrew Flintoff (Eng), Herschelle Gibbs (SA), Adam Gilchrist (Aus), Inzamam-ul-Haq (Pak), Brett Lee (Aus), Glenn McGrath (Aus), Justin Kemp (SA), Shoaib Malik (Pak), Daniel Vettori (NZ), Ricky Ponting (Aus), Kumar Sangakkara (SL), Graeme Smith (SA), Andrew Symonds (Aus), Marcus Trescothick (Eng), Chaminda Vaas (SL), Yousuf Youhana (Pak)

Emerging Player of the Year

Winner: Kevin Pietersen (Eng)
Nominees: Aftab Ahmed (Ban), Ian Bell (Eng), Gautam Gambhir (Ind), Dinesh Karthik (Ind), Manjural Islam Rana (Ban), AB de Villiers (SA)

Umpire of the Year

Winner: Simon Taufel (Aus)

Spirit of Cricket
Winner: England

ICC World XI Teams

ICC Test Team of the Year

Ricky Ponting was selected as the captain of the Test Team of the Year. In addition to a wicket-keeper, 9 other players and a 12th man were announced as follows:

 Virender Sehwag
 Graeme Smith
 Ricky Ponting
 Jacques Kallis
 Brian Lara
 Inzamam-ul-Haq
 Andrew Flintoff
 Adam Gilchrist (wicket-keeper)
 Shane Warne
 Chaminda Vaas
 Glenn McGrath
 Anil Kumble (12th man)

ICC ODI Team of the Year

Marvan Atapattu was selected as the captain of the ODI Team of the Year. In addition to a wicket-keeper, 9 other players and a 12th man were announced as follows:

 Marvan Atapattu
 Adam Gilchrist (wicket-keeper)
 Rahul Dravid
 Kevin Pietersen
 Inzamam-ul-Haq
 Andrew Flintoff
 Andrew Symonds
 Daniel Vettori
 Brett Lee
 Naved-ul-Hasan
 Glenn McGrath
 Jacques Kallis (12th man)

Short lists

Cricketer of the Year
 Andrew Flintoff
 Adam Gilchrist
 Inzamam-ul-Haq
 Jacques Kallis
 Glenn McGrath

Test Player of the Year
 Adam Gilchrist
 Inzamam-ul-Haq
 Jacques Kallis
 Glenn McGrath
 Shane Warne

ODI Player of the Year
 Andrew Flintoff
 Adam Gilchrist
 Brett Lee
 Kevin Pietersen
 Andrew Symonds

Emerging Player of the Year
 Aftab Ahmed
 Ian Bell
 Dinesh Karthik
 Kevin Pietersen
 AB de Villiers

See also

 International Cricket Council
 ICC Awards
 Sir Garfield Sobers Trophy (Cricketer of the Year)
 ICC Test Player of the Year
 ICC ODI Player of the Year
 David Shepherd Trophy (Umpire of the Year)
 ICC Women's Cricketer of the Year
 ICC Test Team of the Year
 ICC ODI Team of the Year

References

External links
 ICC Awards
 Official ICC Awards Web Site

International Cricket Council awards and rankings
Crick
ICC Awards